All the Broken Places is a historical fiction novel by John Boyne. It was published on 15 September 2022 by Doubleday and received mixed reviews from critics.

Plot 
All the Broken Places is a sequel to Boyne's 2006 book The Boy in the Striped Pyjamas and follows the now 91-year-old older sister of Bruno from that book, Gretel. Gretel has lived in London for decades, never speaking of her childhood in Nazi Germany as the daughter of a concentration camp commandant. Her life is upended when a new family moves in next door whose circumstances force her to confront her own past.

Reception 
All the Broken Places received mixed reviews from critics upon release. The novel received praise in The Guardian and the Star Tribune, with the former praising Gretel's characterization and the latter describing the story as "an essential one" and "darkly compelling". Booklist's Margaret Quamme praised Boyne's engagement with the novel's main themes of guilt and complicity with violence but criticized the plot for containing too many coincidences and chance encounters. Martina Devlin, writing in the Irish Independent, said that the historical material of the novel was handled well and that the novel remained fast-paced throughout.

Negative reviews of All the Broken Places focused on its handling of the Holocaust and many of its character's complicity in the events. The Sunday Times criticized the novel's structure and described the plot as not being believable. The Daily Telegraph's Tanya Gold gave the book a 2 out of 5 star rating, writing that the novel could only be described as skillful if "you know nothing about the Holocaust, and if you wish to know nothing," and that the conclusion "shames the author and the reader both." The New Statesman's Ann Manov was even more blunt, describing the novel as "childish drivel" and as having "utterly fail[ed] in its stated purpose" of furthering genocide education. Manov wrote that the novel is "so self-indulgent, so grossly stereotyped, so shameless and insipid that one is almost astonished that [Boyne] has dared."

Publishers Weekly wrote that the novel served as an acceptable sequel to The Boy in the Striped Pajamas but that it wasn't capable of fully standing on its own. Kirkus Reviews was more positive, praising Boyne's character work throughout the book.

References

External links 

 All the Broken Places at BookMarks

2022 Irish novels
English-language novels
Books about the Holocaust
Irish historical novels
Doubleday (publisher) books
Novels by John Boyne